The 2014 Eastleigh Borough Council election took place on 22 May 2014 to elect 15 members of Eastleigh Borough Council in England. This was on the same day as other local elections.

Election result

Steven Sollitt later left the Liberal Democrats to sit as an independent councillor in August 2017.

References

External links
 2014 Eastleigh Borough Council election results at English Elections

2014 English local elections
2014
2010s in Hampshire